This is a list of the first women lawyer(s) and judge(s) in Michigan. It includes the year in which the women were admitted to practice law (in parentheses). Also included are women who achieved other distinctions such becoming the first in their state to graduate from law school or become a political figure.

Firsts in Michigan's history

Lawyers 

First female: Sarah Kilgore Wertman (1871)   
 First female (earned LL.M. degree): Theresa Doland (1917) 
First African American female: Grace G. Costavas Murphy (1923)

State judges 

 First African American female: Geraldine Bledsoe Ford (1948) in 1967  
 First female (justice of the peace): Phoebe Ely Patterson in 1919  
 First female (probate court): Ella Eggleston in 1919  
 First female (Michigan Supreme Court): Mary S. Coleman in 1972  (1972)
 First female (Michigan Supreme Court; Chief Justice): Mary Coleman in 1979  
 First (Hispanic American) female (Michigan Court of Appeals): Dorothy Comstock Riley in 1976  
 First Hispanic American female (Michigan Supreme Court): Dorothy Comstock Riley in 1982  
First Hispanic American female: Patricia P. Fresard in 1998  
First Muslim American female: Mona K. Majzoub in 2004  
First Arab American (female): Charlene Mekled Elder in 2006 
First Asian American (female): Shalina D. Kumar in 2007 
First African American female (Seventeenth Circuit Court): Christina Elmore in 2019 
First Palestinian American (female): Yvonna Abraham in 2021
First African American female (Michigan Supreme Court):  Kyra Harris Bolden in 2022

Federal judges 
First African American female (U.S. District Court for the Eastern District of Michigan): Anna Diggs Taylor (1957) in 1979  
First openly lesbian female (U.S. District Court for the Eastern District of Michigan): Judith Ellen Levy (1996) in 2014  
First Iraqi Chaldean American (female) (United States District Court for the Western District of Michigan): Hala Y. Jarbou in 2020  
First South Asian (female) (U.S. District Court for the Eastern District of Michigan): Shalina D. Kumar in 2021  
First African American female (United States Court of Appeals for the Sixth Circuit): Stephanie D. Davis in 2022

Attorney General of Michigan 

First female: Jennifer Granholm (c. 1987) from 1993-2003 
First openly lesbian female: Dana Nessel in 2018

Solicitor General of Michigan 

 First Muslim Arab American (female): Fadwa Hammoud in 2019

United States Attorney 

 First Muslim American (female): Saima Mohsin in 2021

Assistant United States Attorney 

 First female: Ella Mae Backus in 1923

Judge Advocate General 

First female: Rosemarie Aquilina (1984)

County Prosecutor 

 First female: Emelia Christine Schaub in 1936  
First African American female: Kym Worthy in 2004

Political Office 

First female (Governor of Michigan): Jennifer Granholm (c. 1987) from 2003-2011 
First Muslim American female (Michigan Legislature): Rashida Tlaib (c. 2004) from 2009-2014

Michigan State Bar Association 

 First female president: Julia Donovan Darlow (1971) in 1986  
First African American female president: Victoria Roberts in 1996

Faculty 

 First female law school dean: Joan Mahoney in 1998

Firsts in local history

 Patricia "Pat" Micklow: First female judge in Upper Michigan (1987)
 Margaret Zuzich Bakker (1978): First female district court judge in Allegan County, Michigan
 Karen Tighe (1976): First female judge in Bay County, Michigan
 Dora Whitney: First female lawyer in Berrien County, Michigan
 Mabel Mayfield: First African American female judge in Berrien County, Michigan (2000)
 Mary Coleman: First female judge in Calhoun County, Michigan
 Tracie Tomak: First female district court judge in Calhoun County, Michigan (2018)
 Susan L. Dobrich: First female to serve as the County Prosecutor for Cass County, Michigan (1984)
 Kerry Zahner: First female Public Defender for Charlevoix County, Michigan
 Elizabeth Church: First female judge in Chippewa County, Michigan
 Michelle Ambrozaitis: First female to serve as the County Prosecutor in Clare County, Michigan (2009)
 Alice Day Gardner: First female lawyer in Genesee County, Michigan
 Elza Papp (1947): First female to serve as the Assistant Prosecutor (1947) and district court judge (1965) in Genesee County, Michigan
 Arthalu "Artie" Lancaster (1968): First female to serve as the President of the Genesee County Bar Association, Michigan (1987-1988)
 Edwyna Goodwin Anderson: First African American female admitted to the Genesee County Bar Association, Michigan (1974)
 Karen McDonald Lopez: First female (and African American female) to serve as the Flint City Attorney in Genesee County, Michigan
 Melanie Stanton (1989): First female judge in Grand Traverse County, Michigan
 Amelia C. Leet (1894): First female lawyer in Gratiot County, Michigan
 Carolyn Stell: First female judge in Ingham County, Michigan (1983)
 Carol A. Siemon: First female to serve as the County Prosecutor for Ingram County, Michigan (2016)
 Shauna Dunnings: First female and first African American to serve as a Probate Judge in Ingham County, Michigan (2019)
 Kati Rezmierski: First female to serve as the Chief Assistant Prosecutor for Jackson County, Michigan (2013)
 Elizabeth "Bessie" Eaglesfield: First female lawyer in Grand Rapids, Michigan [Kent County, Michigan]
 Carol Irons: First female judge in Kent County, Michigan (1982)
 Susan Sniegowski: First female judge in Mason County and Lake County, Michigan (2014)
 Emelia Christine Schaub: First female to serve as the County Prosecutor for Leelanau County, Michigan (1936)
 Natalia Koselka: First female judge in Lenawee County, Michigan (1982)
 Tamaris Henagan-Sprow (2017): First female lawyer in Adrian, Michigan [Lenawee County, Michigan]
 Suzanne Geddis: First female elected as a district court judge in Livingston County, Michigan (2004)
 Sheila A. Miller (1990): First African American female judge in Macomb County, Michigan (2006)
 Patricia "Pat" Micklow: First female to serve as an assistant prosecutor in Marquette County, Michigan. She was also the first female to serve as a Judge of the 96th District Court for Marquette County, Michigan (1987).
 Susan Sniegowski: First female judge in Mason County and Lake County, Michigan (2014). She was also the first female to serve as the Prosecuting Attorney for Mason County, Michigan (2005).
 Patricia Costello (1950): First female judge in Monroe County, Michigan
 Ruth Thompson (1924): First female lawyer in Muskegon County, Michigan
 Denise Langford Morris: First African American female (and African American in general) circuit court judge in Oakland County, Michigan
 Jessica R. Cooper: First female to serve as the Prosecutor for Oakland County, Michigan (2008)
 Cora VandeWater: First female judge in Ottawa County, Michigan (1933)
 Juanita F. Bocanegra: First Latino American female judge in Ottawa County, Michigan (2020)
 Kathleen M. Brickley: First female judge in Van Buren County, Michigan (2012)
 Judith James Carlson: First female judge in Washtenaw County, Michigan (1984)
 Nancy Cornelia Wheeler (née Francis): First African American female judge in Washtenaw County, Michigan (1990)
 Betty R. Widgeon: First female (and African American female) to serve as a Judge of the 14-A District Court in Washtenaw County, Michigan (1994)
 Martha Strickland Clark (1887): First female lawyer in Detroit, Michigan [Wayne County, Michigan]
 Clara T. Livermore: First female judge in Detroit, Michigan (1914) [Wayne County, Michigan]
 Lila Neuenfelt: First female to serve on the  Wayne County Circuit Court
 Marjorie McGovern: First African American female to serve as the Assistant Prosecuting Attorney for Wayne County, Michigan (1961). She was also the first African American female to serve as a referee in the Wayne County Probate Court (1957).
 Kym Worthy: First female (and African American) to serve as the County Prosecutor for Wayne County, Michigan (2004)
 Laura A. Echartea: First Latino American female (and Latino American in general) to serve as a Judge of the Thirty-Sixth Judicial District (2011) [Wayne County, Michigan]
 Yvonna Abraham: First Palestinian American (female) to serve on the  Wayne County Third Circuit Court (2021)
 Jelani Jefferson Exum: First African American (female) to serve as the Dean of the University of Detroit Mercy School of Law (2021)

See also  

 List of first women lawyers and judges in the United States
 Timeline of women lawyers in the United States
 Women in law

Other topics of interest 

 List of first minority male lawyers and judges in the United States
 List of first minority male lawyers and judges in Michigan

References 

Lawyers, Michigan, first
Michigan, first
Women, Michigan, first
Women, Michigan, first
Women in Michigan
first women lawyers and judges
Michigan lawyers